Carloto  is a name. Notable people with this name include the following:

Given name
Carloto Cotta (born 1984), Portuguese actor

Surname
Eduardo Luís Carloto (born 1981), Brazilian footballer

See also

Carl Otto
Carlito (disambiguation)
Carlota (name)
Carlotto (name)

Notes